Kevin Little (born April 3, 1968, in Des Moines, Iowa) is a former American athlete, who specialized in sprints. He won the 200-meter race in the 1997 IAAF World Indoor Championships in Paris, France. He won bronze in the same event in 1989, 1993, and 1999 IAAF World Indoor Championships. 

Little graduated from Ankeny High School in 1986.  He won the state title in the 100-meter dash his senior season and the 200-meter dash both his junior and senior seasons.  In college, he competed for Drake University.  His best finish in college came when he finished second in the NCAA 200 in 1989.

Competition record

Personal bests
Little's personal bests are:
 100 metres – 10.14 s (1996)
 200 metres – 20.10 s (1999)
 200 metres indoors – 20.32 s (1999)
 400 metres – 44.77 s (1996)

Notes

References

 Kevin Little profile at IAAF

1968 births
Living people
American male sprinters
Sportspeople from Des Moines, Iowa
Track and field athletes from Iowa
Athletes (track and field) at the 1991 Pan American Games
Pan American Games silver medalists for the United States
Pan American Games medalists in athletics (track and field)
World Athletics Indoor Championships winners
Competitors at the 2001 Goodwill Games
Medalists at the 1991 Pan American Games